The Zusam is a river in Bavaria, Germany and a right tributary of the Danube. Its source is just north of the village of Könghausen, in the Unterallgäu district of Bavaria. It flows north for approximately 97 km, before converging into the Danube near the town of Donauwörth.

Towns and villages along the Zusam include Obergessertshausen, Memmenhausen, Muttershofen,  Ziemetshausen,  Dinkelscherben, Fleinhausen, Zusmarshausen, Zusamzell,  Wertingen, Frauenstetten, and Buttenwiesen.

References

Rivers of Bavaria
Tributaries of the Danube
Bodies of water of Günzburg (district)
Rivers of Germany